24 Hrs is the fifth studio album by English recording artist Olly Murs, released through RCA Records on 11 November 2016. The album has produced the Platinum-certified "You Don't Know Love" and UK top-forty singles "Grow Up" and Unpredictable . Commercially, the album debuted atop the UK Albums Chart giving Murs his fourth UK number-one album.

Promotion

Tour
In September 2016 Olly Murs announced he would embark on a UK Tour, called the Spring & Summer Tour 2017.

Singles
The lead single from the album, "You Don't Know Love",  peaked at number 15 on the UK Singles Chart. The second single, "Grow Up" was released on 7 October 2016 and it peaked at number 25 in the UK Singles Chart.

On 18 November 2016, after the news of the album going to number 1, Murs did a Facebook Live stream and announced that "Years & Years" would be a new single off the album.

The fourth single was announced to be "Unpredictable", which was re-released as a collaboration with Murs' fellow The X Factor contestant (and winner), Louisa Johnson. The release date of the new version was 31 May 2017.

Promotional singles
"Back Around" was made available before the album's release as an instant gratification track on 4 November 2016.

Critical reception
Neil Z. Yeung of AllMusic gave the album three and a half stars in his review, writing "24 Hrs continues Olly Murs maturation, shedding some of his former pop/rock sound in favor of tighter dance-pop sheen and deeper lyrical content. The singer's fifth effort sounds slick indeed, serving up shimmering pop that connects the dots between contemporaries like the 1975, Years & Years, and DNCE. Save for the guitar-based 'Grow Up,' 24 Hrs' its primary objective is to inspire movement. The result is a highly enjoyable LP, upbeat and fun, despite the fact that much of the lyrical content revolves around a rough breakup. [...] Ultimately, 24 Hrs is comforting and reassuring in its ability to lift the spirits, healing broken hearts through dance therapy."

Commercial performance
The album debuted at number one on the UK Albums Chart on 18 November 2016 with sales of 58,000 copies, giving Murs his fourth consecutive UK number one album.

Track listing

Charts and certifications

Weekly charts

Year-end charts

Certifications

24 Hrs (Acoustic)

24 Hrs (Acoustic) is an EP containing five acoustic versions of songs from the album, released on 24 December 2016.

Track listing

References

2016 albums
Olly Murs albums
Epic Records albums
Albums produced by Cutfather
Albums produced by Steve Robson
Albums produced by MNEK
Albums produced by TMS (production team)